James Cohan is a contemporary art gallery in the Tribeca neighborhood of Manhattan, New York City.

History 

The gallery had a branch in the Chelsea neighborhood of Manhattan. It opened another in the former French Concession of Shanghai in 2008, and in 2015 opened a third branch, in Chinatown, Manhattan.

Controversy
A coalition of Asian American groups entered and protested Omer Fast's October 2017 exhibit that attempted to reproduce stereotypical Chinatown aesthetics. Fast apologized but not before characterizing the protesters as few in number and comparing them to the right-wingers who stormed Charlottesville earlier in the year.

References 

Art museums and galleries in Manhattan
Cohan, James
Contemporary art galleries in the United States